Yashkul (Yaşkuľ) is a rural locality (a settlement) and the administrative center of Yashkulsky District of the Republic of Kalmykia, Russia. Population:

Climate
Yashkul has a cold semi-arid climate (Köppen climate classification BSk), with cold winters and some of the hottest summers in Russia.

References

Notes

Sources

Rural localities in Kalmykia
Yashkulsky District